Cameron Bouchea Thomas (born October 13, 2001) is an American professional basketball player for the Brooklyn Nets of the National Basketball Association (NBA). He was a consensus five-star recruit and one of the best shooting guards in the 2020 class. He played college basketball at Louisiana State University (LSU).

Early life
Thomas was born in Yokosuka, Kanagawa Prefecture, Japan while his mother was living there. When he was seven, he won a contest by making 33 free throws in a row.

As a freshman, Thomas began playing basketball for Oscar F. Smith High School in Chesapeake, Virginia. He did not play in his sophomore season because he and his mother "weren't on the same page" as the team's coaching staff. For his junior season, he transferred to Oak Hill Academy in Mouth of Wilson, Virginia, where he joined Cole Anthony and Kofi Cockburn in one of the most touted teams in the country. Thomas averaged a team-high 26.2 points, 3.8 rebounds and 3.4 assists per game, leading his team to a 31–5 record. In July 2019, he was named Offensive Player of the Year at the Nike Elite Youth Basketball League after averaging a league-best 29.5 points per game for Boo Williams. As a senior at Oak Hill, Thomas averaged 31.5 points, six rebounds and 3.4 assists per game, leaving as the program's all-time leading scorer. Thomas posted 30-plus points in nine games, including two 40-point performances. He led his team to the Tournament of Champions title, where he was named most valuable player. Thomas was selected to play in the Jordan Brand Classic.

Recruiting
On November 18, 2019, Thomas committed to play college basketball for LSU. He chose the Tigers over an offer from UCLA, among others, after taking official visits to both schools.

College career
In Thomas's college debut on November 26, 2020, he scored 27 points in a 94–81 win against SIU Edwardsville. Thomas led all freshman in scoring with 23 points per game, while also averaging 3.4 rebounds and 1.4 assists per game. He was named to the First Team All-SEC. On April 15, 2021, he declared for the 2021 NBA draft, forgoing his remaining college eligibility.

Professional career

Brooklyn Nets (2021–present)
Thomas was selected with the 27th pick in the 2021 NBA draft by the Brooklyn Nets. Thomas was later included in the roster of the Nets to play in 2021 NBA Summer League. On August 5, 2021, Thomas signed with the Brooklyn Nets. Thomas was named NBA Summer League MVP with Davion Mitchell averaging 27 points per game and was the Summer League leading scorer, and was named to the Summer League First Team. On October 19, 2021, Thomas made his debut in the NBA, coming off the bench to score two points in a 104–127 loss to the Milwaukee Bucks. On November 20, while on assignment with the Long Island Nets, he scored 46 points in a 114–110 win over the Raptors 905.

Thomas joined the Nets' 2022 NBA Summer League roster. On July 18, 2022, Thomas was named to the All-NBA Summer League First Team. On December 10, Thomas scored a then-career-high 33 points in a 136–133 win over the Indiana Pacers.

On February 4, 2023, Thomas put up a then career-high 44 points in a 125–123 win over the Washington Wizards. The next game, Thomas scored a new career-high 47 points in a 124–116 loss to the Los Angeles Clippers. He became the second youngest player in NBA history to score at least 40 points in consecutive games, behind LeBron James. On February 7, 2023, Thomas put up 43 points in a 116–112 loss to the Phoenix Suns. With this game, Thomas became the youngest player in NBA history to score at least 40 points in three consecutive games. On February 10, 2023, he was fined $40,000 by the NBA for making an "anti-gay" comment during a post-game interview following a game the night before against the Chicago Bulls.

Career statistics

NBA

Regular season

|-
| style="text-align:left;"| 
| style="text-align:left;"| Brooklyn
| 67 || 2 || 17.6 || .433 || .270 || .829 || 2.4 || 1.2 || .5 || .1 || 8.5
|- class="sortbottom"
| style="text-align:center;" colspan="2"| Career
| 67 || 2 || 17.6 || .433 || .270 || .829 || 2.4 || 1.2 || .5 || .1 || 8.5

Playoffs

|-
| style="text-align:left;"|2022
| style="text-align:left;"|Brooklyn
| 1 || 0 || 0.5 || — || — || — || .0 || .0 || .0 || .0 || .0
|- class="sortbottom"
| style="text-align:center;" colspan="2"|Career
| 1 || 0 || 0.5 || — || — || — || .0 || .0 || .0 || .0 || .0

College

|-
| style="text-align:left;"| 2020–21
| style="text-align:left;"| LSU
| 29 || 29 || 34.0 || .406 || .325 || .882 || 3.4 || 1.4 || .9 || .2 || 23.0

References

External links
LSU Tigers bio
USA Basketball bio

2001 births
Living people
American men's basketball players
Basketball players from Virginia
Brooklyn Nets draft picks
Brooklyn Nets players
Long Island Nets players
LSU Tigers basketball players
Shooting guards
Sportspeople from Chesapeake, Virginia